Sharon Keogan (born March 1967) is an Irish Independent politician who has served as a Senator for the Industrial and Commercial Panel since April 2020.

Political career
Keogan started out her political career on the Fianna Fáil national executive, however, having failed to secure a nomination to run for Fianna Fáil, she left the party. She joined alliance of independent candidates known as New Vision. She is still part of an independent alliance of various candidates. Keogan unsuccessfully contested the general elections of 2011, 2016 and 2020 in the Meath East constituency.

Meath County Councillor
She was a member of Meath County Council from 2014 to 2020, representing the Laytown-Bettystown local electoral area, Her sister, Geraldine, was co-opted to fill the vacancy on 8 June 2020. Although she also won an additional seat in the Ashbourne local electoral area at the 2019 local elections, secured election in both the Ashbourne LEA and the Laytown-Bettystown LEA, becoming the first woman in Ireland elected to two electoral areas. One of the seats had to be vacated as no member may hold two seats simultaneously. She tried to claim two State grants after her election in two boroughs. She was replaced in this seat by Amanda Smith. Following her election to the Seanad, her sister Geraldine Keogan was co-opted to fill her seat on Meath County Council.

Senator
Keogan made national headlines in January 2020, after she posted on her Facebook account asking whether disabled children should be microchipped following the death of Nóra Quoirin in Malaysia.

It was in the same month that Keogan's office was the subject of a suspected case of arson after she made public statements about the killing of a taxi driver in her area. Keogan speculated that her anti-drug views had also made her a target of local criminals.

In September 2021 Keogan was criticised after she stated that there is "an organised takeover at every level in our society" by the LGBT community in response to the Katherine Zappone Affair. Keogan went on to indicate that she believed that "governments around the world" are trying to "catapult" LGBT people into high-level jobs. Former Leas-Chathaoirleach of Seanad Éireann Jerry Buttimer responded that "She is entitled to her own opinions but she can also be asked to explain herself and to be challenged" and criticised her statement as suggesting there is some kind of on-going conspiracy and for echoing far-right sentiments. The Meath branches of the Social Democrats and People Before Profit also issued statements condemning Keogan's assertions, with the Meath-based President of Ógra Fianna Fáil Bryan Mallon stating that Keogan had looked at ZapponeGate and had “added 2 + 2 together and got 5, ridiculously using it as an opportunity to dismiss the issues that members of the LGBTQIA+ community suffer daily, not least fair representation in government". In a statement given to The Times, Keogan claimed she had "an established record in supporting and participating in LGBT education programmes within my community" but was "opposed to governments, whether the Biden administration or the Irish government, appointing personnel based on their sexual orientation".

Since joining the Senate, Keogan, alongside Peter Fitzpatrick, Mattie McGrath, Carol Nolan and Rónán Mullen have formed the Oireachtas Life and Dignity Group; a unit which advocates for pro-life and anti-euthanasia views. In 2021 the group tried to build support for a proposed "Foetal Pain Relief Bill", but the bill was ultimately voted down in December of that same year.

In April 2022 Keogan congratulated right-wing Hungarian leader Victor Orban upon his party's victory in the 2022 Hungarian parliamentary election, stating on Twitter: "#VictorOrban winner alright. When 6 different parties try to squash nationalism, this is what happens. Orban doesn't bend the knee to anyone. #Hungary first, his #people first and #family first". Keogan was subsequently criticised for that view, amongst others, in an article by Una Mullally for the Irish Times.

It was also in April 2022 that Keogan was criticised by fellow senators such as Lynn Ruane after Keogan expressed the view that surrogacy was "harmful, exploitative and unethical", that she "wholeheartedly objects to the commercialisation of the human child", and told a witness representing the organisation "Irish Gay Dads" during an Oireachtas Committee exploring surrogacy laws that he was "extremely lucky to be here today". Following more questions by Keogan to witnesses that were ruled to be out of order, interim chairperson Kathleen Funchion told Keogan she was being disrespectful and was asked to leave on the grounds of disorderly conduct. Keogan subsequently objected to comments by Ruane that Keogan was being "crude and cold" and that she was expressing "personal bigotry" on the topic. Keogan wrote, "I wish to object to this deeply personal attack on me during a public meeting and contend that the language used by the member was inflammatory, discriminatory and sought to characterise me and my contribution unfairly" and commented that the committee was acting like an "echo chamber". She resigned from the Joint Oireachtas Committee on Children, Equality, Disability, Integration and Youth in April 2022, stating that she no longer felt "safe or protected as a member of the committee".

References

1967 births
21st-century women members of Seanad Éireann
Fianna Fáil politicians
Independent members of Seanad Éireann
Irish anti-abortion activists
Living people
Local councillors in County Meath
Members of the 26th Seanad
People from County Meath